MV Chieftain,  ex-Seabus, is a passenger ferry built in 2007 for Clyde Marine Services to run the Strathclyde Partnership for Transport (SPT) Gourock to Kilcreggan service on the Firth of Clyde. 

From 2012 to 2018 the service was run by Clydelink with a smaller boat, while Seabus carried out cruises or other work and was renamed Chieftain. 

After dissatisfaction with Clydelink, the contract went in May 2018 to Clyde Marine, and Chieftain returned to the Kilcreggan service. In June 2020 CalMac took over managing the service from SPT, leasing Chieftain which in 2021 was repainted in CalMac livery.

History
MV Seabus was built in Cornwall, in 2007, as a 'dedicated' passenger ferry to replace the 71-year-old  on the service between Gourock, Kilcreggan and Helensburgh, across the Firth of Clyde (Tail of the Bank). Owned by Clyde Marine, Seabus operated the main ferry service to Kicreggan, with crossings of Gare Loch to Helensburgh, for the Strathclyde Partnership for Transport (SPT) who subsidised the route, and was painted in the STP carmine and cream livery. 

On re-tendering, the Helensburgh part of the then 'triangular' route ceased and the contract for the  Gourock - Kilcreggan service was awarded to Clydelink.
To operate the route, Clydelink bought the smaller MV Island Princess from Lymington, which had been a harbour excursion vessel, and commenced service on 1 April 2012. The change was unpopular with a loss of jobs.

The hull of Seabus was painted dark blue to match Clyde Marine livery, then in 2014 it was renamed Chieftain.  It carried out work for hire in the Highlands, including parts of the Caledonian Canal, and on the Firth of Forth.

Clydelink were unreliable. Their contract was terminated early and the work awarded to Clyde Marine, who resumed the Gourock to Kilcreggan ferry service on 14 May 2018 with  Chieftain. After negotiations, CalMac took over the contract from 1 June 2020, leasing Chieftain from Clyde Marine and giving crew the option of transferring to the new operator.

Layout

MV Seabus brought a greater degree of comfort and safety to the route with a sealed and heated passenger cabin. Larger, roomier and more comfortable than her predecessor, she has better facilities for people with mobility problems.

Service
 Gourock – Kilcreggan – Helensburgh service on the Firth of Clyde and the Gare Loch (Helensburgh service discontinued by 2018).

References

Ferries of Scotland
Ships of Scotland
2007 ships